Tashkan-e Sadat (also Romanized as Tashkan-e Sādāt; also known as Tashkan, Tīshkhīn, Tīshkīn, and Tashkan-e Seyyedya) is a village in Teshkan Rural District, Chegeni District, Dowreh County, Lorestan Province, Iran. At the 2006 census, its population was 90, in 20 families.

References 

Towns and villages in Dowreh County